Anna Maria dePeyster  (née Torv; formerly Murdoch and Mann; born 30 June 1944) is a Scottish and Australian journalist and novelist.

Biography

Early life
Anna Torv was born in Glasgow, Scotland in 1944 to Jakob Tõrv (anglicised Jacob Torv), an Estonian merchant seaman, and Sylvia Braida, a Scottish drycleaner. Her parents had a drycleaning business in Glasgow, until they emigrated to Australia. When they opened a picnic park outside Sydney and it went bankrupt, her mother left the family household. She has two brothers and one sister. Raised Catholic, she attended Our Lady of Mercy College, Parramatta, New South Wales, Australia.

Career
She started her journalistic career at the age of 18, working on Sydney's Daily Mirror, and also worked as a journalist for the Sydney Daily Telegraph. She later served on the board of directors of News Corporation.

She has written three books. Her first novel, In Her Own Image, is about two sisters who fall in love with the same man on a sheep station close to the Murrumbidgee River.

Personal life
She was married to Rupert Murdoch from 1967 to 1999. They had three children:
Elisabeth Murdoch (born 1968)
Lachlan Murdoch (born 1971)
James Murdoch (born 1972)

When they divorced in 1999, she reportedly received $1.7 billion (including $110 million in cash) from the settlement. She remarried six months later, to William Mann, a financier. They resided in The Hamptons, in a house formerly owned by the philanthropist Yasmin Aga Khan.

According to The Independent, the kidnappers and killers of Muriel McKay, wife of Murdoch's deputy Alick McKay, had originally intended to kidnap Anna Murdoch instead, and confusion arose when the McKays had made use of one of Murdoch's vehicles.

In 1998, she was made a Dame of the Order of St. Gregory the Great.

Her husband William Mann died in 2017. She remarried to Ashton dePeyster in April 2019.

Bibliography
In Her Own Image (Morrow, 1986) 
Family Business (Morrow, 1988) 
Coming to Terms (1992)

References

1944 births
Living people
Writers from Glasgow

British billionaires
British expatriates in Australia
British expatriates in the United States
British people of Estonian descent
Australian people of Estonian descent
Dames of St. Gregory the Great
Murdoch family
News Corporation people
Roman Catholic writers
Scottish journalists
Scottish women journalists
Scottish novelists
Scottish Roman Catholics
Scottish women writers
Scottish people of Estonian descent